The Zwenkauer See is the largest lake in the Neuseenland situated 12 km south of Leipzig. It is on the site of a former lignite open cast mine.

External links 
 
 Lake facts overview (German)

Lakes of Saxony
Mining in Saxony
Leipzig (district)
LZwenkauer See